The table below lists many of the tunnels under the River Thames in and near London, which, thanks largely to its underlying bed of clay, is one of the most tunnelled cities in the world. The tunnels are used for road vehicles, pedestrians, Tube and railway lines and utilities. Several tunnels are over a century old: the original Thames Tunnel was the world's first underwater tunnel.

List of tunnels

Other tunnels 

The figure and list above leaves out a tunnel to the site of the old Ferranti power station on the east side of the mouth of Deptford Creek.

There is also a tunnel between Cottons centre and the old Billingsgate Fish Market near to London Bridge. Citibank used it for cabling at one point; it was large enough for a person to walk through. 

The Silvertown Tunnel is a new Thames river crossing proposed to supplement the existing Blackwall Tunnel, which will join the Greenwich Peninsula with West Silvertown.

Background 

London's abundance of river tunnels has resulted from a number of factors. For historical reasons, the city centre has relatively few railway bridges. Only three railway bridges exist in central London, only one of which provides through services across the capital. Consequently, railway builders have had to tunnel under the river in the city centre rather than bridge it. By contrast, railway bridges are relatively common to the west of the inner city.

Another historical factor has been the presence of the Port of London, which until the 1980s required large ships to be able to access the river as far upstream as the City of London. Until the construction of the Queen Elizabeth II Bridge at Dartford in 1991, the easternmost bridge on the Thames was Tower Bridge in central London. Even now, the Dartford Crossing provides the only way to cross the Thames by road between London and the sea. The width of the river downstream meant that tunnels were the only options for crossings before improvements in technology allowed the construction of high bridges such as the Queen Elizabeth II Bridge.

See also 
 Crossings of the River Thames
 Subterranean London

References